Let's Dance 2017 is the twelfth season of the celebrity dance show Let's Dance in Sweden. The presenters are David Hellenius and new for this season is presenter Tilde de Paula Eby who replaces Jessica Almenäs. It premiered on 10 March 2017.

Cancelled episode
On 7 April the fifth episode of the series was cancelled after the attack in Stockholm that happened earlier in the day. The dances planned for the episode were performed on the 13 April episode, and the season continued as planned, but with two couples being eliminated in the upcoming episodes on 13 and 14 April. The double episodes in week 5 were pre-planned, but originally, only one couple would have been eliminated in the Friday episode, with the combined score from Thursdays episode being counted to the final result.

Couples

Scoring chart

Red numbers indicate the lowest score for each week.
Green numbers indicate the highest score for each week.
 indicates the couple (or couples) eliminated that week.
 indicates the returning couple that finished in the bottom two (or bottom three).
 indicates the winning couple.
 indicates the third place couple.
 indicates the runner-up couple.

References

2016
TV4 (Sweden) original programming
2017 Swedish television seasons